The Christianization of Iberia refers to the spread of Christianity in the early 4th century by the sermon of Saint Nino in an ancient Georgian kingdom of Kartli, known as Iberia in classical antiquity, which resulted in declaring it as a state religion by then-pagan King Mirian III of Iberia. Per Sozomen, this led the king's "large and warlike barbarian nation to confess Christ and renounce the religion of their fathers", as the polytheistic Georgians had long-established anthropomorphic idols, known as the "Gods of Kartli". The king would become the main sponsor, architect, initiator and an organizing power of all building processes. Per Socrates of Constantinople, the "Iberians first embraced the Christian faith" alongside the Abyssinians, but the exact date of an event is still debated. Georgian monarchs, alongside the Armenians, were among the first anywhere in the world to convert to a Christian faith. Prior to the escalation of Armeno-Georgian ecclesiastical rivalry and the christological controversies their Caucasian Christianity was extraordinarily inclusive, pluralistic and flexible that only saw the rigid ecclesiological hierarchies established much later, particularly as "national" churches crystallized from the 6th century. Despite the tremendous diversity of the region, the christianization process was a pan-regional and a cross-cultural phenomenon in the Caucasus, Eurasia's most energetic and cosmopolitan zones throughout the late antiquity, hard enough to place Georgians and Armenians unequivocally within any one major civilization. The Jews of Mtskheta, the royal capital of Kartli, that did play a significant role in the Christianization of the kingdom, would give a strong impetus to deepen the ties between the Georgian monarchy and the Holy Land leading to an increasing presence of Georgians in Palestine, as the activities of Peter the Iberian and other pilgrims confirm, including the oldest attested Georgian Bir el Qutt inscriptions found in the Judaean Desert alongside the pilgrim graffiti of Nazareth and Sinai.

Iberia was a factor in a competitive diplomacy of the Roman and Sasanian Empires, and on occasion became a major player in proxy wars between the two empires. Iberia, a Georgian monarchy, that shared many institutions and concepts with the neighboring Iranians, being physically connected to their "Iranian Commonwealth" since the Achaemenid period through commerce, war or marriage, its adoption of Christianity meant that King Mirian III made a cultural and historical choice with profound international implications, though his decision was never tied with the Roman diplomatic initiatives. Iberia, architecturally and artistically rooted in Achaemenid culture, from its Hellenistic-era establishment to the conversion of the crown, embarked on a new multi-phased process that took centuries to complete, encompassing the entire 5th, 6th and early 7th centuries, resulting in the emergence of a strong Georgian identity.

On the eve of the historic christianization, the king and the queen were quickly acculturated Georgianized foreigners, the physical fusion of Iranian and Greek cultures, Saint Nino, also a foreigner, the earliest first two chief bishops of Kartli, also foreigners, the Greeks, sent by the emperor Constantine the Great. Only in the first half of the 6th century, the Georgians would permanently seize the highest ecclesiastical posts, but outsiders like Greeks, Iranians, Armenians and Syrians would continue playing a prominent role in the administration of the Georgian church.

Christianization by an Apostle
Even though Iberia officially embraced Christianity in the early 4th century, the Georgian Orthodox Church claims apostolic origin and regards Andrew the Apostle as the founder of the Georgian church, also supported by some Byzantine sources. Ephrem Mtsire would later explain Saint Nino's role with the necessity of Iberia's "second Christening". The archaeological artifacts confirm the spread of Christianity before the conversion of King Mirian in the 4th century. Some of the third-century burials in Georgia include Christian objects such as signet rings with a cross and ichthys or anchor and fish, clearly attesting their Christian affiliation. These can mean that the upper class Iberians had embraced Christianity much earlier than its "official Christianization" date.

Christianization of the royal family

According to The Georgian Chronicles and the Conversion of Kartli chronicle, a Cappadocian woman Nino converted Queen Nana and later King Mirian III to Christianity, that led to the Christianization process of the entire kingdom of Kartli and its people. Tyrannius Rufinus, Gelasius of Caesarea, Gelasius of Cyzicus, Theodoret, Socrates of Constantinople and Sozomen, whom Bacurius the Iberian, a royalty, a "little king" and a principal commander of emperor Theodosius I, served as one of the sources of the Georgian conversion to Christianity; all have the similar narrative of the Georgian tradition, the only major thing that differs per these Greco-Roman authors is Nino being an unnamed Roman captive who was brought to Iberia. According to Georgian sources, Nino was a daughter of Zabilon and Susana, a family endowed with a direct but unlikely link to Jerusalem. When she went to Jerusalem to see her father once she asked if anyone knew where the Seamless Robe of Jesus was, she was told that it was kept "in the eastern city of Mtskheta, a country of Kartli [i.e. Iberia]." She would decide to go to Iberia and will eventually reach the mountains of Javakheti after four months of travel, in June. She stayed for two days at the Paravani Lake and then continued her travel towards the royal city of Mtskheta. When she reached the capital, she found herself at the pagan holiday held for god Armazi with King Mirian taking part in the ceremony. Nino, shocked by the event, started to pray, resulting in the "severe wind" that destroyed the pagan statue. Later she was approached by the attendants of Queen Nana who was suffering from a grave illness. She was asked to cure the queen. The queen was healed immediately, and Nino converted the queen to Christ. Hearing about the queen's healing, the king was "very surprised". He initially opposed his wife's new religion until he, too, encountered a miracle one day while hunting, riding and "looking over Uplistsikhe" through the woods of Tkhoti mountain when he suddenly was surrounded by a threatening darkness of the solar eclipse.

When at last, he called Christ, his wife's new God, for help – the daylight immediately returned. The king jumped down from the horse, raised his hands up to the "eastern sky" and said:

After saying this, the king promised again to the new God to erect "a pillar of Cross". When safely returned to the capital, greeted by his "queen and the entire nation" of Kartli, the king "shouted loudly" where was his "savior and mother, a stranger lady", Nino. When told, he with his army went directly to her. At the urging of Nino, the king laid the foundations of a church to commemorate his new faith, Christianity. According to Movses Khorenatsi after Mirian's conversion, Nino "destroyed the image of Armazi, the god of thunder". When the church was completed, the king sent ambassadors to the emperor Constantine the Great requesting him to send clergy to help establish the faith in the kingdom. Per Sozomen, Constantine hearing the news of the Christian conversion of Iberia, "the emperor of the Romans was delighted, acceding to every request that was proffered." Foundation of the Georgian Church and spread of a new religion in Kartli were made possible mostly by the activities of kings and aristocracy. King Mirian's main church-building activity in Mtskheta saw the construction of the Svetitskhoveli Cathedral, according to the Georgian tradition connected with the Seamless Robe of Jesus, brought by a pious Jew named Elias, an eyewitness of the Crucifixion of Jesus, to Mtskheta from Jerusalem in the first century. The Samtavro Monastery, king's own sepulchre church, was built outside the city though. This remembers the situation of the church buildings of Constantine the Great and his family outside of the Roman pomerium. But the sepulchre of the first Christian Georgian king was inside the church whereas the sepulchres for the members of the Constantinian dynasty were located in an own imperial mausoleum near the church. Also, the Constantinian churches were devoted to the cult of Christian martyrs, whereas the earliest history of the Georgian church had no martyrs.

After the conversion and Christianization of the monarchy, the Georgians intensified their contacts with the Holy Land. A pre-Christian Iberia have had a Jewish community as early as the times of Nebuchadnezzar II and there were close and deep connections in the Iberian ideology of the sacred – with the holiness of Jerusalem. This Iberian fascination with Jerusalem and Zion, largely predates the claims Georgia's unprecedented "Byzantinizing" Bagrationi monarchs to have descended directly from King David. Iberia by having a direct connection to Jerusalem, had several monasteries there already. It was Jerusalem where Rufinus met Bacurius, and by the end of the fourth century a Georgian monastery was founded there. During the reign of Vakhtang I, the Georgian hero-king, the Georgian church would receive the rank of Catholicos and be recognized autocephalous by the Church of Antioch.

Christianization of the countryside
Despite the royal enthusiasm for the new religion, and its adoption within court circles, Christianity took root slowly in the rural districts of the kingdom. Nino and her entourage met hostility from highlanders inhabiting the southeastern slopes of the Caucasus Mountains, but ultimately, they were persuaded to surrender their idols. Resistance also arose within the Jewish community of Mtskheta. The first steps in the Christianization of Iberia's countryside occurred in the late fifth and early sixth centuries when after it within a generation, the indigenous monastic traditions took deep root, and facilitated the spread of Christian faith into the more peripheral regions of Kartli. Sometime in the 530s or 540s, Thirteen Assyrian Fathers arrived in Mtskheta, whose activity would result in the establishment of some sixteen monasteries and other churches all around Georgia, many of whose sixth-century foundations still can be observed today.

Christianization date

Estimates of the conversion date by historians have ranged over much of King Mirian's long reign. Foreign and Georgian scholars' proposed dates are the following: AD 312, 317, 318, 320, 323, 325/6/7/8, 330/1/2/3/4/5/6/7. Once widely accepted AD 337 for Iberia's conversion, is favored nowadays by many scholars to be AD 326, possibly a "third Sunday after Easter" per John Zosimus, that was on 1 May, the year traditionally held by the Georgian Orthodox Church.

Apart from the historians, Iberia's conversion is of greater interest during decades of debates, to the astronomy scholars – who maintain that there is a high possibility that the total solar eclipse of AD 319, 6 May is the exact date of the Georgian conversion, an eclipse that reached eastern Georgia, and this "eclipse hypothesis" is not new. An eclipse per model ΔT≈7500 with solar azimuth angle being about 290° would make king and his fellow hunters – or royal entourage – witness the totality of it, but not the townspeople nearby. The visibility conditions for the king on the Tkhoti mountain could have been similar to the Solar eclipse of 11 July 2010 as seen at sunset from the mountainous terrain of Patagonia. During the eclipse of AD 319, observers at lower elevations near Mtskheta, would have seen the sky grow prematurely dark and then slightly brighter, without the Sun reappearing over the horizon. At higher elevations nearby such as where the king might have been, totality of an eclipse may indeed have been a remarkable sight. L. V. Morrison and F. R. Stephenson according to their geophysical model ΔT≈7450±180°, do not contradict this scenario and an intriguing possibility, but it remains an open question whether the ancient and medieval written accounts are trustworthy, if they are really based on actual facts.

According to The Georgian Chronicles it was "one day of Summer, July 20, a Saturday."

See also
Constantine the Great and Christianity
State church of the Roman Empire

Notes

References

Bibliography
Georgian Chronicles, Conversion of King Mirian and with him All of the Kartli by Our Saint Mother and Apostle Nino, Part No. 30
Plontke-Lüning, A. (2011) Narratives about Early Church Buildings in Armenia and Georgia, Moscow State University
Haas, C. (2014) Geopolitics and Georgian Identity in Late Antiquity: The Dangerous World of Vakhtang Gorgasali, Brill Publishers
Haas, C. (2008) Mountain Constantines: The Christianization of Aksum and Iberia, Journal of Late Antiquity 1.1, Johns Hopkins University Press
Suny, R. G. (1994) The Making of the Georgian Nation, Indiana University Press
Mgaloblishvili, T. (2014) Ancient Christianity in the Caucasus, Routledge
Rapp, S. H. Jr. (2016) The Sasanian World Through Georgian Eyes, Caucasia and the Iranian Commonwealth in Late Antique Georgian Literature, Sam Houston State University, USA, Routledge
Rapp, S. H. Jr. (2014) New Perspectives on "The Land of Heroes and Giants": The Georgian Sources for Sasanian History, Sam Houston State University
Rapp, S. H. Jr. & Mgaloblishvili, T. (2011) Manichaeism in Late Antique Georgia? Chapter 17, University of Oklahoma
Sauter, J. Simonia, I. Stephenson, F. R. & Orchiston, W. (2015) The Legendary Fourth-Century Total Solar Eclipse in Georgia: Fact or Fantasy? Springer Publishing
Schaff, P. (2007) Nicene and Post-Nicene Fathers: Second Series Volume II Socrates, Sozomenus

4th-century Christianity
Kingdom of Iberia
Chosroid dynasty
Georgian Orthodox Church
History of Christianity in Asia
History of Christianity in Europe
Christianization of Europe
310s
320s